Alström is a Swedish surname. Notable people with the surname include:

Carl-Henry Alström (1907–1993), Swedish psychiatrist
Alström syndrome
Per Alström (born 1961), Swedish ornithologist
Sara Alström (born 1975), Swedish actress
Victor Alström (born 1986), Swedish ice hockey player

See also
Alstom

Swedish-language surnames